Melanie Jane Roche (born 9 November 1970 in Bankstown, New South Wales) is a softball player from Australia.  She has won a bronze medal at the 1996 Summer Olympics and 2000 Summer Olympics, a silver medal at the 2004 Summer Olympics along with a bronze medal in the 2008 Beijing Olympics. Participating in 4 Olympic Games and winning 4 Olympic Medals is an Australian Olympic Record.  Roche was a two-time First Team All-American at Oklahoma State University, where she played from 1990 to 1993.  While in college, Roche tallied 774 strikeouts in 658-2/3 innings, a ratio that is tied for 28th all-time. She was inducted into the OSU Hall of Honor on 2 September 2011.

Roche has played and coached professionally in Japan for 16 years in Osaka, Kyoto and Tokyo. In her down time she studies audio engineering, has a keen interest in science (physics) and music.

Roche is a softball pitcher best known for her angular velocity and her competitive nature.

Mel Roche released her first CD "In Full Flight" on 5 June 2010. Many of the songs have been inspired through her 16-year Olympic Journey.

External links
 Australian Institute of Sport profile

1970 births
Living people
Australian softball players
Olympic softball players of Australia
Oklahoma State Cowgirls softball players
Softball players at the 1996 Summer Olympics
Softball players at the 2000 Summer Olympics
Softball players at the 2004 Summer Olympics
People from New South Wales
Olympic medalists in softball
Medalists at the 2008 Summer Olympics
Softball players at the 2008 Summer Olympics
Medalists at the 2004 Summer Olympics
Medalists at the 2000 Summer Olympics
Medalists at the 1996 Summer Olympics
Olympic silver medalists for Australia
Olympic bronze medalists for Australia